The Last Coiner is a graphic novel, written by RTS Award-winning filmmaker Peter M. Kershaw, with comicbook artist Vince Danks whose credits include the Torchwood Official Magazine, the independently published Harker and Critchley from Ariel Press, and Fleetway Editions Ltd. Red Dwarf Smegazine.

The book tells the story of the 18th Century Cragg Vale Coiners. The counterfeiter "King" David Hartley appears here as David Hawkswort (Keith Patrick). Mark Wilson Smith also appears. Actors performed against blue screen, which formed a basis for the digitized artwork.

Duchy Parade Films released a graphic novel featuring digitized actors, a docudrama first seen at the Hebden Bridge Picture House, andCoins & Nooses, an online game.

References 
 http://www.bbc.co.uk/northyorkshire/content/articles/2006/10/24/the_last_coiner_feature.shtml
 http://www.halifaxcourier.co.uk/news/Coiners-could-soon-be-back.1806208.jp

External links 
 http://www.thelascoinermovie.com/

British graphic novels